Warren Road station is a Baltimore Light Rail station located off Warren Road in Cockeysville, Maryland. The station opened in 1997 as part of the system's northern extension. It has two side platforms serving two tracks.

References

External links
MTA Maryland - Light Rail stations

Baltimore Light Rail stations
Cockeysville, Maryland
Railway stations in the United States opened in 1997
Railway stations in Baltimore County, Maryland
1997 establishments in Maryland